Adams is a town in northern Berkshire County, Massachusetts, United States. It is part of the Pittsfield, Massachusetts Metropolitan Statistical Area. The population was 8,166 at the 2020 census.

History

Nathan Jones purchased the township of East Hoosac at auction in 1762 from the Province of Massachusetts Bay for £3,200. In 1778, the town was officially incorporated as Adams, named in honor of Samuel Adams, a revolutionary leader and signer of the Declaration of Independence. Much of the land had been subdivided into  and  lots. These were mostly farms with frontage on the Hoosic River, which over time would provide water power for woolen, cotton, lumber, and plastic mills.

First settled in 1745, North Adams was originally part of Adams until the town split in 1878. Although there has never been a town of South Adams, the name was used prior to 1878 to specify the southern part of the town that had long had two primary centers, and survives in the name of the South Adams Savings Bank, which was incorporated in 1869.

Early settlers in the 1760s included a group of Quakers, many of whom migrated together from Smithfield, Rhode Island. The Quaker civil rights leader, abolitionist, and suffragist Susan B. Anthony was born in 1820 in Adams, and her family lived there until she was six. They moved west into New York, and later moved again to western New York. Anthony's childhood home has been preserved and is operated today as a museum.

The town's population declined from 1810 to 1820 as farmers moved west for better soil. The War of 1812 had the unintended result of stimulating development of the textile industry in the United States because British textiles were no longer available. In 1814, the Adams South Village Cotton Manufacture Company opened. With the construction of a number of mills on the Hoosic River, the demand for labor increased greatly, and Adams' population more than doubled to 4,000 between 1820 and 1835. Growth in both halves of Adams also was stimulated by the opening of the Hoosac Tunnel in 1875. In the late 1800s, during the expansion of the cotton mills, four large brick buildings were constructed on Park Street: the P. J. Barrett Block, Jones Block, Armory Block, and the Mausert Block, opposite the Town Hall. They were used for retail stores and offices.

President William McKinley made two visits to the town, the second in 1897 to lay the cornerstone of the Adams Free Library. He was a friend of the Plunkett brothers (founders in 1889 of the Berkshire Cotton Manufacturing Company), and of the textile industry generally. In 1903, the town honored the assassinated president by erecting a larger-than-life statue beside the library.

Berkshire Cotton later became a major part of Berkshire Hathaway; it continued to manufacture high-quality textiles through the mid-20th century. Its large factory in Adams was closed in 1958. Many textile jobs had moved South, as the industry relocated to states with lower wages and weak unions.

The mill town's only major remaining mill, Specialty Minerals, mines and processes limestone for calcium carbonate. This is used in antacids and food supplements, as well as paper whiteners and other industrial purposes.

Since the late 20th century, the town has encouraged historic and destination tourism, part of a broader trend in the Berkshires. It has promoted its natural environment and outdoor activities, and its proximity to the galleries, museums and colleges of North Adams.

Geography

The town lies along the valley surrounding the Hoosic River and its tributary brooks. The mountain, located within the state reservation of the same name, is the highest point in Massachusetts, a waypoint on the Appalachian Trail, and in the 19th-century inspired writers including Herman Melville. The town also includes a corner of Savoy Mountain State Park.

Adams is bordered to the north by North Adams, to the east by Florida and Savoy, to the south by Savoy and Cheshire, and to the west by New Ashford and Williamstown.

Transportation
Massachusetts Route 8 is the primary north–south road through town, and was originally signed as New England Interstate Route 8, which extended southward to Bridgeport, Connecticut. The town is the northern terminus of Route 116, which extends southeast to Springfield.

Until 1953 the New York Central Railroad had operated passenger trains from North Adams, south through Adams towards Pittsfield and Chatham, New York over Boston & Albany rail lines. The station house, Adams station still stands. Amtrak train service on the Lake Shore Limited is available 15 miles to the south at Pittsfield's Scelsi ITC.

Freight rail once ran through the town, but is now mostly converted to the paved Ashuwillticook Rail Trail. The town lies along the northern route of the Berkshire Regional Transit Authority. Regional bus service can be found in North Adams, as can regional air service at Harriman-and-West Airport. The nearest airport with international flights is Albany International Airport in New York.

Climate

In a typical year, Adams, Massachusetts temperatures fall below 50F° for 205 days per year. Annual precipitation is typically 44.5 inches per year (high in the US) and snow covers the ground 77 days per year or 21.1% of the year (the highest in the US). It may be helpful to understand the yearly precipitation by imagining 9 straight days of moderate rain per year. The humidity is below 60% for approximately 18.4 days or 5.0% of the year.

Demographics

As of the census of 2000, there were 8,809 people, 3,992 households, and 2,431 families residing in the town. Adams is the third most populated town in Berkshire County, and ranks 184th out of the 351 cities and towns in Massachusetts. The racial makeup of the town was 98.02% White, 0.36% Black or African American, 0.08% Native American, 0.24% Asian, 0.05% Pacific Islander, 0.27% from other races, and 0.98% from two or more races. Hispanic or Latino of any race were 0.82% of the population.

There were 3,992 households, out of which 26.9% had children under the age of 18 living with them, 45.0% were married couples living together, 11.9% had a female householder with no husband present, and 39.1% were non-families. 34.8% of all households were made up of individuals, and 17.7% had someone living alone who was 65 years of age or older.  The average household size was 2.20 and the average family size was 2.81.

In the town, the population was spread out, with 22.4% under the age of 18, 6.6% from 18 to 24, 26.9% from 25 to 44, 23.6% from 45 to 64, and 20.4% who were 65 years of age or older.  The median age was 41 years. For every 100 females, there were 89.2 males.  For every 100 females age 18 and over, there were 85.0 males.

The median income for a household in the town was $32,161, and the median income for a family was $40,559. Males had a median income of $34,110 versus $23,556 for females. The per capita income for the town was $18,572.  About 7.0% of families and 10.3% of the population were below the poverty line, including 12.7% of those under age 18 and 12.9% of those age 65 or over.

Government

Adams employs the representative town meeting form of government, and is led by a town administrator and a board of selectmen. The current selectmen are Richard Blanchard, John Duval, Christine Hoyt, Joseph Nowak and Howard Rosenberg.  Conduct on the Town's Boards have had divisions, tensions and accusations.   The town has its own services, including police, fire and public works.  The nearest hospital, North Adams Regional Hospital, is located in neighboring North Adams.

The Adams Free Library was founded in 1897, and was established as a war memorial, with the cornerstone being laid by President McKinley himself. In fiscal year 2008, the town of Adams spent 2.18% ($261,939) of its budget on its public library—some $31 per person.

On the state level, Adams is represented in the Massachusetts House of Representatives by the First Berkshire district, which covers northern Berkshire County, as well as portions of Franklin County.  In the Massachusetts Senate, the town is represented by the Berkshire, Hampshire and Franklin district, which includes all of Berkshire County and western Hampshire and Franklin counties. The town is patrolled by the Fourth (Cheshire) Station of Barracks "B" of the Massachusetts State Police.

On the national level, Adams is represented in the United States House of Representatives as part of Massachusetts's 1st congressional district, and has been represented by Richard Neal of Springfield since January 2013. Massachusetts is currently represented in the United States Senate by senior Senator Elizabeth Warren and junior Senator Ed Markey.

Education
Adams is joined with neighboring Cheshire, and Savoy to form a regional school district.  Both towns share an elementary school Plunkett Elementary School that serves Kindergarten to 3th Grade. All 3 towns then send students to Hoosac Valley Middle School from 4th Grade, and 7th Grade, and Hoosac Valley High School from 8th Grade and 12th Grade, just over the border in Cheshire. Hoosac Valley's colors are red and white, and their teams are nicknamed the "Hurricanes."

Adams is also home to the Berkshire Arts & Technology Charter Public School (BArT) serving grades six through twelve. BArT is a free public school.

High school students may choose to attend the public Charles H. McCann Technical High School in North Adams. There is also a parochial school in Adams, Saint Stanislaus Kostka, which serves students from pre-kindergarten through eighth grade, and other private schools are located in neighboring towns.

The nearest community college is Berkshire Community College in Pittsfield. The nearest state college is Massachusetts College of Liberal Arts in North Adams, and the nearest university is University of Massachusetts Amherst. The nearest private college is Williams College in nearby Williamstown.

Sites of interest

 Adams Agricultural Fair
 Ashuwillticook Rail Trail
Greylock Glen
 Hoosac Valley Train
 Maple Street Cemetery
 Mount Greylock State Reservation
 Pittsfield & North Adams Passenger Station and Baggage & Express House
 Quaker Meeting House (1782)
 St. Stanislaus Parish Roman Catholic Church
 Summer Street Historic District
 Susan B. Anthony Birthplace & Museum

Notable people
 Daniel Read Anthony (1824–1904), publisher and militant abolitionist
 Susan B. Anthony (1820–1906), women's suffragist
 George N. Briggs (1796–1861), Governor of Massachusetts
 Lona Cohen (1913–1992) Soviet spy
 George P. Lawrence (1859–1917), US congressman
 Dale Long (1926–1991) Major League Baseball player
 Albert L. Phillips (born 1824), Wisconsin politician
 Stacy Schiff (born 1961), author

See also

 American school of magic in Harry Potter, Ilvermorny
 List of mill towns in Massachusetts

References

External links

 Town of Adams official website
 Explore Adams
 Berkshire Visitors Bureau
 History of Adams, Massachusetts (1885)
 
 

 
Towns in Berkshire County, Massachusetts
1778 establishments in Massachusetts
Towns in Massachusetts